24 teams competed in the 2006 FIVB Volleyball Men's World Championship, with two places allocated for the hosts, Japan and the titleholder, Brazil. In the qualification process for the 2006 FIVB World Championship, the Five FIVB confederations were allocated a share of the 22 remaining spots.

Confederation qualification processes
The distribution by confederation for the 2006 FIVB Volleyball Men's World Championship was:

 Asia and Oceania (AVC): 5 places (+ Japan qualified automatically as host nation for a total of 6 places)
 Africa (CAVB): 2 places
 Europe (CEV): 9 places
 South America (CSV) 2 places (+ Brazil qualified automatically as the defending champions for a total of 3 places)
 North America (NORCECA): 4 places

AVC

  (First Round)
  (Second Round, Playoff Round)
  (Second Round)
  (First Round, Second Round)
  (Second Round, Playoff Round)
  (First Round, Second Round)
  (Second Round)
  (First Round)
  (Second Round)
  (First Round)
  (First Round)
  (First Round)
  (First Round)
  (First Round, Second Round)
  (Second Round, Playoff Round)
  (First Round)
  (First Round, Second Round)
  (First Round, Second Round)
  (First Round, Second Round)

CAVB

  (Second Round)
  (First Round)
  (Second Round)
  (Second Round)
  (Second Round)
  (First Round)
  (First Round)
  (First Round)
  (Second Round)
  (First Round, Second Round)
  (First Round, Second Round)
  (Second Round)
  (First Round)

CEV

  (First Round)
  (Second Round)
  (First Round)
  (First Round)
  (First Round)
  (First Round)
  (Second Round, Third Round, Playoff Round)
  (Second Round)
  (Second Round, Third Round)
  (Second Round)
  (First Round, Second Round)
  (First Round, Second Round, Third Round)
  (Second Round, Third Round)
  (Third Round)
  (Second Round, Third Round)
  (Third Round)
  (First Round)
  (First Round)
  (Third Round)
  (Second Round)
  (First Round)
  (Third Round, Playoff Round)
  (First Round)
  (First Round)
  (Third Round)
  (Second Round, Third Round, Playoff Round)
  (First Round, Second Round)
  (Third Round)
  (First Round)
  (Third Round)
  (Second Round)
  (First Round, Second Round)
  (Third Round)
  (Second Round, Third Round)
  (Second Round, Third Round, Playoff Round)

CSV

  (First Round)
  (First Round)
  (First Round)
  (First Round)
  (First Round)
  (First Round)
  (First Round)

NORCECA

  (First Round)
  (First Round, Second Round)
  (First Round)
  (Second Round)
  (First Round)
  (First Round, Second Round)
  (Second Round)
  (First Round)
  (First Round, Second Round)
  (First Round)
  (First Round)
  (Second Round)
  (First Round)
  (First Round)
  (Second Round)
  (Second Round)
  (First Round)
  (First Round)
  (First Round, Second Round)
  (Second Round)

References

External links
FIVB

2006 FIVB Volleyball Men's World Championship
FIVB Volleyball World Championship qualification